The 1931 SANFL Grand Final was an Australian rules football competition. North Adelaide beat Sturt 115 to 77.

Teams

References 

SANFL Grand Finals
SANFL Grand Final, 1931